Chances Are It Swings is an album by American jazz trumpeter and arranger Shorty Rogers performing compositions by Robert Allen which was released on the RCA Victor label in 1959.

Reception

Allmusic awarded the album 4 stars.

Track listing 
All compositions by Robert Allen and Al Stillman except where noted.
 "Chances Are" - 3:19
 "No Such Luck" - 2:19
 "It's Not For Me To Say" - 4:38
 "Lilac Chiffon" (Robert Allen, Peter Lind Hayes) - 4:01
 "I Just Don't Know" (Robert Allen, Joe Stone) - 4:27
 "Who Needs You?" - 2:58
 "Everybody Loves a Lover" (Robert Allen, Richard Adler) - 3:50
 "Come to Me" (Allen, Hayes) - 2:48
 "My Very Good Friend in the Looking Glass" - 3:33
 "You Know How It Is" - 3:22
 "A Very Special Love" (Allen) - 2:00
 "Teacher, Teacher" - 2:37

Personnel 
Shorty Rogers - trumpet, flugelhorn, arranger
Conte Candoli, Pete Candoli, Don Fagerquist, Ollie Mitchell, Al Porcino, Ray Triscari - trumpet 
Harry Betts, Dick Nash, Ken Shroyer - trombone
Bob Enevoldsen - valve trombone
Paul Horn, Bud Shank - clarinet, flute, alto saxophone 
Bill Holman, Richie Kamuca - tenor saxophone 
Chuck Gentry - baritone saxophone
Gene Estes - vibraphone
Barney Kessel, Howard Roberts - guitar
Pete Jolly - piano
Joe Mondragon - bass 
Mel Lewis - drums

References 

Shorty Rogers albums
1959 albums
RCA Records albums
Albums arranged by Shorty Rogers